Tim Jaeger (born August 6, 1979) is an American artist. He currently lives and works in Sarasota, Florida.

Early life and education 
Jaeger was born in Kalamazoo, Michigan as the 4th of 5 children to an Episcopal priest. At a young age Jaeger moved to Paducah, Kentucky. In 1998, Jaeger, relocated to Sarasota, Florida to earn his bachelors of arts from the Ringling College of Art and Design.

Rooster series 
Jaeger began the "CS" series of rooster during an artist residency in Moncaret, France in 2008. The large-scale painting employs a palette of bright fire-engine reds and cools pastels for added impact. “Until a couple years ago, I worked solely with the human figure, and throughout that time, found myself becoming more interested in the paint and what I could do with the color, application, and process, rather than the subject itself. The subject of my works became impressions, the mundane imprint of the human shape, rather than real expressions of humanity. As I searched for a new subject matter, I found myself increasingly and inexplicably painting roosters.”

Selected exhibitions, awards, and projects 

 Art in Bloom, Paducah School of Design and Art, Paducah, KY, 2016
 Curator, Kevin Dean: Extra Ordinary, Alfstad Contemporary, Sarasota, FL, 2015
 Curator, All in the Family, Icehouse Artspace, Sarasota, FL, 2013
 SELECT ART FAIR, Art Basel Miami, Miami, FL, 2012
 Artist that Made Sarasota Famous Invitational, Sarasota Art Center, Sarasota, FL, 2012
 Florence Biennale, group exhibition, Florence Italy, 2009
 Prospect One Biennale Exhibition, group exhibition, New Orleans LA, 2008
 Chateau L’ Hespiret, solo exhibition, Montcaret France, 2008, 2009
 Founder, SARTQ artist cooperative, 2008

References

External links 
 Official Jaeger web site
 Video-2012 Emmy Nominee: A Comb and A Brush, The Artist Who Paints
 Video- Inside the artist's studio with Tim Jaeger

Living people
1979 births
Painters from Florida
People from Sarasota, Florida
Ringling College of Art and Design alumni